Norwood is the soundtrack album by American musician Glen Campbell from his 1970 film Norwood. The album was released by Capitol Records in June 1970.

Track listing
Side 1:
 "Ol' Norwood's Comin' Home" (Mitchell Torok, Ramona Redd) - 1:47 (vocal - Glen Campbell)
 "Country Girl" (Al De Lory) - 2:52
 "Marie" (Mitchell Torok, Ramona Redd) - 2:32 (vocal - Glen Campbell)
 "The Brass Ensemble of Ralph. Texas" (Al De Lory) - 2:16
 "The Repo Man" (Mac Davis) - 1:54 (vocal - Glen Campbell)
 "Hot Wheels" (Al De Lory) - 2:45
 "I'll Paint You a Song" (Mac Davis) - 4:05 (vocal - Glen Campbell)
 
Side 2:
 "Norwood (Me and My Guitar)" (Mac Davis) - 2:35 (vocal - Glen Campbell)
 "The Fring Thing" (Al De Lory) - 2:33
 "Down Home" (Mac Davis) - 2:04  (vocal - Glen Campbell)
 "Chicken Out (Joann's Theme)" (Al De Lory) - 1:48
 "I'll Paint You a Song" (Reprise) (Mac Davis) - 2:07 (vocal- Glen Campbell)
 "A Different Kind of Rock" (Al De Lory) - 2:30
 "Everything a Man Could Ever Need" (Mac Davis) - 2:26 (vocal - Glen Campbell)

Personnel
Glen Campbell - vocals, acoustic guitar

Production
Executive producer - Al De Lory
Producer - Neely Plumb/IMC Productions
Arranged by Al De Lory, Gus Levene
Recording Engineers - John Neal, Jack Manchen, Joe Polito
Conductor - Al De Lory

Charts
Album - Billboard (United States)

Singles - Billboard (United States)

1970 soundtrack albums
Comedy film soundtracks
Glen Campbell soundtracks
Capitol Records soundtracks
Single-artist film soundtracks